De Ruyter Medal (Dutch: De Ruyter-medaille) was created by royal decree no. 1 on 23 March 1907 by Queen Wilhelmina of the Netherlands, to be awarded to those members of the Dutch Merchant fleet who distinguish themselves by praiseworthily acts of duty for the Dutch Ship transport. The medal can be awarded in gold, silver or bronze. Awarding is on basis by nomination of the Netherlands government and by royal decree.

With the De Ruyter Medal the Kingdom of the Netherlands honors since 1907 the threehundredth birthday of Michiel de Ruyter, one of the most famous admirals in Dutch history.

Orders, decorations, and medals of the Netherlands
Awards established in 1907
1907 establishments in the Netherlands